Cold as Ice may refer to:

 Cold as Ice (album), an album by Charli Baltimore
 "Cold as Ice" (Foreigner song), 1977
 "Cold as Ice" (Sarah Connor song), 2010
 "Cold as Ice", a 2023 song by Ava Max on the album Diamonds & Dancefloors
 "Cold as Ice", a 2017 song by Blacklite District, featured on the 2020 album Instant // Concern
 "Cold as Ice", a 2001 song by No Angels on the album Elle'ments
 "Cold as Ice", a 2006 song by Nathan on the album Masterpiece
 "Cold as Ice", a 2001 song by M.O.P. on the album Warriorz
 "Cold as Ice", a song by Indigo Girls on the 2005 album Rarities
 Cold as Ice (novel), a 1992 science fiction novel by Charles Sheffield
 Cold as Ice, a novel by Anne Stuart

See also
 Cool as Ice, 1991 film starring rapper Vanilla Ice
 Cool as Ice (soundtrack), soundtrack of the film
 "Cool as Ice (Everybody Get Loose)", song from the film/soundtrack